Euglesa fultoni is a species of bivalve in the family Sphaeriidae. It is endemic to central Tasmania and  Australia. It has been recorded in several freshwater locations including Arthurs Lake, Lake Sorrell, Lake Butters, Lake Malbena, Lake Olive, and Lake Nugetena.

References

Bivalves of Australia
Sphaeriidae
Molluscs described in 1983
Taxonomy articles created by Polbot
Taxobox binomials not recognized by IUCN